Jamelle is a name. Notable people with the name include:

 Hina Jamelle, American architect
 Jamelle Cornley (born 1987), American basketball player
 Jamelle Elliott (born 1974), American women's basketball head coach
 Jamelle Folsom (1927–2012), First Lady of Alabama
 Jamelle Hagins (born 1990), American basketball player
 Jamelle Holieway (born 1967), American football quarterback

See also
Jamell (disambiguation)